Lev Semenovich Pontryagin (also written Pontriagin or Pontrjagin) (3 September 1908 – 3 May 1988) was a Soviet mathematician. He was born in Moscow and lost his eyesight completely due to an unsuccessful eye surgery after a primus stove explosion when he was 14. Despite his blindness he was able to become one of the greatest mathematicians of the 20th century, partially with the help of his mother Tatyana Andreevna who read mathematical books and papers (notably those of Heinz Hopf, J. H. C. Whitehead, and Hassler Whitney) to him. He made major discoveries in a number of fields of mathematics, including optimal control, algebraic topology and differential topology.

Work
Pontryagin worked on duality theory for homology while still a student. He went on to lay foundations for the abstract theory of the Fourier transform, now called Pontryagin duality. With René Thom, he is regarded as one of the co-founders of cobordism theory, and co-discoverers of the central idea of this theory, that framed cobordism and stable homotopy are equivalent. This led to the introduction around 1940 of a theory of certain characteristic classes, now called Pontryagin classes, designed to vanish on a manifold that is a boundary. In 1942 he introduced the cohomology operations now called Pontryagin squares. Moreover, in operator theory there are specific instances of Krein spaces called  Pontryagin spaces.

Later in his career he worked in optimal control theory. His maximum principle is fundamental to the modern  theory of optimization. He also introduced there the idea of a bang-bang principle, to describe situations where the applied control at each moment is either the maximum positive 'steer', or the maximum negative 'steer'.

Pontryagin authored several influential monographs as well as popular textbooks in mathematics.

Pontryagin's students include Dmitri Anosov, Vladimir Boltyansky, Revaz Gamkrelidze, Evgeni Mishchenko, Mikhail Postnikov, Vladimir Rokhlin, and Mikhail Zelikin.

Controversy and anti-semitism allegations
Pontryagin was accused of anti-Semitism on several occasions. For example, he attacked Nathan Jacobson for being a "mediocre scientist" representing the "Zionism movement", while both men were vice-presidents of the International Mathematical Union. He rejected  charges of anti-Semitism in an article published in Science in 1979, claiming that he struggled with Zionism, which he considered a form of racism. When a prominent Soviet Jewish mathematician, Grigory Margulis, was selected by the  IMU to receive the Fields Medal at the upcoming 1978 ICM, Pontryagin, who was a member of the executive committee of the IMU at the time, vigorously objected. Although the IMU stood by its decision to award Margulis the Fields Medal, Margulis was denied a Soviet exit visa by the Soviet authorities and was unable to attend the 1978 ICM in person.
Pontryagin also participated in a few notorious political campaigns in the Soviet Union, most notably, in the Luzin affair.

Publications

 (translated by Emma Lehmer)
 1952 - Foundations of Combinatorial Topology (translated from 1947 original Russian edition) 2015 Dover reprint
 1962 - Ordinary Differential Equations (translated from Russian by Leonas Kacinskas and Walter B. Counts)
 
 1962 - with Vladimir Boltyansky, Revaz Gamkrelidze, and : The Mathematical Theory of Optimal Processes

See also
Andronov–Pontryagin criterion
Kuratowski's theorem, also called the Pontryagin–Kuratowski theorem
Pontryagin class
Pontryagin duality
Pontryagin's maximum principle

Notes

External links

Autobiography of Pontryagin (in Russian)
 Kutateladze S. S., Sic Transit... or Heroes, Villains, and Rights of Memory.
 Kutateladze S. S., The Tragedy of Mathematics in Russia

1908 births
1988 deaths
Russian blind people
Control theorists
Heroes of Socialist Labour
Russian mathematicians
Soviet mathematicians
Full Members of the USSR Academy of Sciences
Blind academics
20th-century Russian mathematicians
Soviet people
Academic staff of Moscow State University
Scientists with disabilities